The 2015–16 Pro50 Championship was the fourteenth edition of the Pro50 Championship, a List A cricket tournament in Zimbabwe. The competition ran from 4 November 2015 to 6 January 2016. In a change from the previous edition, teams played each other twice (instead of three times) during the round-robin, and there was no final.

Mashonaland Eagles won the tournament for the fourth time, with five victories and one defeat.

Mid West Rhinos batsman Prince Masvaure was the tournament's leading run-scorer with a total of 250 runs. Matabeleland Tuskers bowler Tawanda Mupariwa was the leading wicket-tacker with a total of 13 wickets.

Points table

Fixtures

Round-robin

References

External links
 Series home at ESPN Cricinfo

2015 in Zimbabwean cricket
2016 in Zimbabwean cricket
Pro50 Championship
Pro50 Championship